SS Augustus Saint-Gaudens was a Liberty ship built in the United States during World War II. She was named after Augustus Saint-Gaudens, a Beaux-Arts sculptor that embodied the ideals of the "American Renaissance", designer of the Saint-Gaudens double eagle, and founder of the "Cornish Colony".

Construction
Augustus Saint-Gaudens was laid down on 20 December 1943, under a Maritime Commission (MARCOM) contract, MC hull 1549, by J.A. Jones Construction, Panama City, Florida; she was launched on 17 February 1944.

History
She was allocated to Black Diamond Steamship Company, on 30 March 1944. On 17 May 1946, she was laid up in the National Defense Reserve Fleet, in the James River Group, in Lee Hall, Virginia. On 3 May 1947, she was transferred to the Italian Government, which in turn sold her to Societe Coop di Navigazione Resp. Ltda., Genoa, Italy, on 27 May 1947. She was renamed Nazareno. In 1948, she was sold to Garibaldi Societe Coop di Navigazione Resp. Ltda., Genoa. She was scrapped in Spezia, in 1967.

References

Bibliography

 
 
 
 
 

 

Liberty ships
Ships built in Panama City, Florida
1944 ships
James River Reserve Fleet
Liberty ships transferred to Italy